The Šumadija Mountain Range (Шумадијске планине) is a highland in central Serbia, between rivers Sava and Danube in the north, river Great Morava in the east, river West Morava in the south, and Kolubara, Ljig and Dičina in the west.

Its major mountains include Avala (511 m), Kosmaj (626 m), Venčac (659 m), Bukulja (696 m), Rudnik (1,132 m), Ješevac (902 m), Vujan (856 m), Kablar (889 m), Gledić mountains (922 m), Juhor (774 m), Crni Vrh (Jagodina) (707 m), Kotlenik (749 m), the latter including Gruža mountain and Ljubić mountain.

See also
Mountains of Serbia

References

Mountain ranges of Serbia
Dinaric Alps
Mountain ranges of Europe